The 1988 Malta International Football Tournament  (known as the Rothmans Tournament for sponsorship reasons) was the third edition of the Malta International Tournament. The competition was played between 8 and 12 February, with games hosted at the National Stadium in Ta' Qali.

Matches 

Note: Carmel Busuttil set the goal-scoring record for Malta (8 goals)

Winner

Statistics

Goalscorers

See also 
China Cup
Cyprus International Football Tournament

References 

1987–88 in Maltese football
1987–88 in German football
1988